Los que volvieron ("Those Who Returned") is a 1948 Mexican film. It stars Sara García, and includes Malú Gatica.

External links
 

1948 films
1940s Spanish-language films
Mexican black-and-white films
Mexican mystery films
1948 mystery films
1940s Mexican films